Mitin Mashi is a 2019 Indian Bengali detective film directed by Arindam Sil, produced by Rupa Datta and presented by Camellia Production Pvt. Ltd. The film starring Koel Mallick and Vinay Pathak, is based on the Hate Matro Tintey Din, a story by the novelist Suchitra Bhattacharya. Mullick portrays the fictional detective character, Mitin Masi, created by Bhattacharya. The film was released on 2 October 2019.

Cast 
 Koel Mallick as Pragyaparamita Mukherjee aka Mitin Masi
 Vinay Pathak
 June Malia
 Riya Banik as Oindrilla aka Tupur, Mitin's niece and sidekick
 Subhrajit Datta as Partha, Mitin's husband
 Anirban Chakrabarti
 Koyel Das

Release 
The first look poster of the movie was revealed on 28 May 2019. The official teaser was released by Camellia Films Production on 1 September 2019. The official trailer was released by Camellia Films Production ten days later on 10 September 2019.
The film was released on 2 October 2019.

Soundtrack 

The soundtrack is composed by Bickram Ghosh and lyrics by Rajiv Pandey and Sugato Guha.

References

External links
 

Indian detective films
2019 films
Films based on Indian novels
Films scored by Bickram Ghosh
Bengali-language Indian films
2010s Bengali-language films
Films based on works by Suchitra Bhattacharya